The Garrett F109 (Company designation TFE109) was a small turbofan engine developed for the Fairchild T-46 by Garrett AiResearch. With the United States Air Force's cancellation of the T-46 program in 1986, further development of the engine ceased, and with it the civil TFE109 version.

Variants
ATE109 The Advanced Technology Engine (ATE) turboshaft, which was built jointly with Allison for the Light Helicopter Experimental (LHX) powerplant program and included the F109 power section.
TSE109 A turboshaft demonstrator in the  power class that first ran on August 2, 1984.
TFE109 The civil version of the F109.
F109-GA-100 The full military designation for the TFE109 turbofan.

Applications
 Fairchild T-46
 Promavia Jet Squalus

Specifications

See also

References

 
 Gunston, Bill (1988). Jane's All the World's Aircraft 1988-89, 79th Edition. Jane's Information Group, Coulsdon, Surrey, England, UK: Jane's Information Group Limited 

Medium-bypass turbofan engines
F109
1980s turbofan engines
Centrifugal-flow turbojet engines